Kwan Tsui-hang (born 22 September 1949 in Macau) is a member of the Legislative Assembly of Macau. Kwan Tsui-hang obtained her graduate degree in sociology at University of Hong Kong and Jinan University. Kwan Tsui-hang is married to Lee Kuok Vá and have two sons.

Election results

References

1949 births
Living people
Cantonese people
Members of the Legislative Assembly of Macau
Jinan University alumni
Union for Development politicians
Macau women in politics